Mafe may refer to:

People
 Ade Mafe (born 1966), English sprinter
 Asiwaju Yinka Mafe (1974–2020), Nigerian politician
 Boye Mafe, American American football player

Other
 Mafe or Peanut stew
 The MAFE Project